Sanjay Bhatia (born 5 July 1960) is the Upa-Lokayukta of Maharashtra (equivalent to a deputy ombudsman) and current head (in charge, I/C) of the Lokayukta. He is the former Chairman of Mumbai Port Trust and Indian Ports Association. He is an Indian Administrative Service officer of 1985 batch who has served at various levels of the state and central governments in India.

Early life and education 

He is a mechanical engineer with an MBA from Southern Cross University, Australia, and a Maharashtra cadre IAS officer of the 1985 batch.

Career 

Upa-Lokayutka of Maharashtra with a term of five years from August'20. 
 Chairman of the Mumbai Port Trust for four years till July'20 and Indian Ports Association(dual role),a position equivalent in rank to the Chief Secretary of the State and a Secretary in the Centre.
Vice Chairman & Managing Director, CIDCO (Development of New towns, Airport, METRO). 
Commissioner, Sales Tax, Managing Director of Maharashtra State Electricity Distribution Co, Director, Heavy Industries, Central government, Collector, Gadchiroli,CEO, ZP, Solapur.

Personal life 

Bhatia is a practitioner of meditation, and teaches heartfulness meditation.

References 

Indian Administrative Service officers
Ombudsmen in India
Living people
1960 births